The Shire of Narembeen is a local government area in the eastern Wheatbelt region of Western Australia, about  east of the state capital, Perth, and between the shires of Merredin to the north, and Kondinin to the south.

History
The Narembeen Road District was gazetted on 6 June 1924. On 1 July 1961, it became a shire following the passage of the Local Government Act 1960, which reformed all remaining road districts into shires.

Towns and localities
The towns and localities of the Shire of Narembeen with population and size figures based on the most recent Australian census:

Heritage-listed places

As of 2023, 172 places are heritage-listed in the Shire of Narembeen, of which five are on the State Register of Heritage Places.

References

External links

 

Narembeen